Choc may refer to:

 Chocolate
 Choc (magazine), a French photography magazine
 Choc (typeface), a typeface by Roger Excoffon
 Choc Bay, in Gros Islet Quarter, Saint Lucia
 Choč Mountains, in north-central Slovakia
 Choc River, in the Soufrière Quarter, Saint Lucia
 Le choc (The Shock), a 1982 French film

People
 Ramiro Choc, Guatemalan Mayan leader
 Anthony Mundine (born 1975), Australian boxer nicknamed Choc
 Choc Sanders (1900–1972), American football player, coach, and teacher

See also
 CHOC (disambiguation)
 Choctaw, a community of people